Conrad of Leonberg, or Leontorius, or his real name was Konrad Töritz.  He was a German Cistercian monk and Humanist scholar.

Biography
Cornad was born at Leonberg in Swabia in 1460. He took vows at the Cistercian monastery of Maulbronn in the Neckar district, which, unlike most other Cistercian monasteries of those times, was then enjoying its golden age. In 1490 he became secretary to the general of his order.
 
When the German Humanists began to revive the study of the Latin and Greek classics, as Conrad deplored the barbarous Latin in which the scholastic philosophers and theologians of Germany were expounding the doctrine of their great masters, he was in full accord with their endeavours to restore the classical Latinity of the Ciceronian Age. 
 
He also, by word and example, encouraged the study of Greek, but was especially attracted by the great Hebrew scholar Reuchlin (d. 1522) who inspired Conrad with his own enthusiasm for the study of Hebrew. Like Reuchlin, his friend and teacher, Conrad was convinced of the necessity of Hebrew for a thorough understanding of the Holy Scriptures, and became one of the few great Hebrew scholars of his time. He was in correspondence with the best writers in sacred and profane literature, and was highly esteemed by the learned men of his period. For a time he was engaged in the printing-office of Johann Amerbach at Basle. He was close to Amberbach and supported the use of the Latin script instead of the gothic in his sons handwriting. He has introduced the young Bonifacius Amerbach to Latin poetry in May 1507 in Engental. In 1506 he edited the second edition of the collected works from Ambrose for the printer Johannes Petri. It was one of the early books to have an index.
  
He died at the abbey Engenthal in Muttenz near Basle probably on 7 January 1511.

Works
Besides writing numerous Latin poems, orations and epistles, he published (Basle, 1506-8) the Latin Bible with the "Postilla" and "Moralitates" of the Oxford Franciscan Nicolas de Lyra, together with the "Additiones" of Paul of Burgos (d. 1435) and the "Replicæ" of Mathias Thoring (d. 1469).

Sources
Catholic Encyclopedia article

References 

German Cistercians
German Renaissance humanists
1460 births
1511 deaths
Year of death uncertain